These are the official results of the 2004 Ibero-American Championships in Athletics which took place on August 6–8, 2004 in Huelva, Spain.

Men's results

100 meters

Heats – August 6Wind:Heat 1: 0.0 m/s, Heat 2: 0.0 m/s, Heat 3: 0.0 m/s

Final – August 6Wind:0.0 m/s

Extra – August 6Wind:0.0 m/s

200 meters

Heats – August 7Wind:Heat 1: -2.3 m/s, Heat 2: -1.8 m/s, Heat 3: -3.2 m/s

Final – August 8Wind:-4.3 m/s

400 meters

Heats – August 6

Final – August 7

800 meters

Heats – August 6

Final – August 8

1500 meters
August 7

3000 meters
August 8

5000 meters
August 6

110 meters hurdles

Heats – August 7Wind:Heat 1: -1.7 m/s, Heat 2: -0.4 m/s

Final – August 8Wind:-0.6 m/s

400 meters hurdles

Heats – August 6

Final – August 7

3000 meters steeplechase
August 7

4 x 100 meters relay
August 7

4 x 400 meters relay
August 8

20,000 meters walk
August 7

High jump
August 7

Pole vault
August 8

Long jump
August 8

Triple jump
August 6

Shot put
August 6

Discus throw
August 8

Hammer throw
August 7

Javelin throw
August 6

Decathlon
August 6–7

Women's results

100 meters

Heats – August 6Wind:Heat 1: -0.7 m/s, Heat 2: -0.4 m/s, Heat 3: -0.9 m/s

Final – August 6Wind:0.0 m/s

Extra – August 6Wind:0.0 m/s

200 meters

Heats – August 7Wind:Heat 1: -2.2 m/s, Heat 2: -1.0 m/s

Final – August 8Wind:-1.6 m/s

400 meters

Heats – August 6

Final – August 7

800 meters

Heats – August 6

Final – August 8

1500 meters
August 7

3000 meters
August 8

5000 meters
August 7

100 meters hurdles

Heats – August 7Wind:Heat 1: -0.5 m/s, Heat 2: -0.7 m/s

Final – August 8Wind:-2.1 m/s

400 meters hurdles

Heats – August 6

Final – August 7

3000 meters steeplechase
August 6

4 x 100 meters relay
August 7

4 x 400 meters relay
August 8

10,000 meters walk
August 6

High jump
August 8

Pole vault
August 6

Long jump
August 6

Triple jump
August 7

Shot put
August 8

Discus throw
August 7

Hammer throw
August 6

Javelin throw
August 8

Heptathlon
August 6–7

References

Results
Official results (archived)

Ibero-American Championships Results
Events at the Ibero-American Championships in Athletics